The Mesopotamian himri (Carasobarbus luteus) is a species of ray-finned fish in the genus Carasobarbus.

References 

Carasobarbus
Fish described in 1843